Paola Andrea Lattus Ramos (born 19 August 1980) is a Chilean film, theater, and television actress, known for appearing in films such as Tony Manero (2008) by Pablo Larraín and Optical Illusions (2009) by Cristián Jiménez.

Biography
The daughter of distinguished theater actors Ángel Lattus and Teresa Ramos, Paola Lattus began to develop her theatrical career at age 11 in the Theater Company of the University of Antofagasta, participating in a dozen plays, in addition to the Harlequin Theater Company, founded by her own mother in the same city.

In 2000 she entered the Fernando González Acting School. After graduating, she organized summer workshops for teenagers at the Harlequin Theater Company, in which she tried to convey the importance of theater as a reflection on the social environment. She has also conducted acting classes at the University of Chile and University UCINF, among others.

She began her film career in 2008 in the Pablo Larraín drama Tony Manero. The following year, she received an  Award for Best Supporting Actress for her work in Optical Illusions (2009) by Cristián Jiménez. She was also nominated for a Pedro Sienna Award for the same film.

Film

Features

Shorts

TV series

Theater

As actress
 1991 – Mariana Pineda (University of Antofagasta Theater Company)
 2003 – Amador Ausente (Harlequin Theater Company)
 2005 – La Reina Isabel cantaba Rancheras (University of Antofagasta Theater Company)
 2007 – Niño Pecado (Harlequin Theater Company)
 2007 – El niño y las estrellas (Harlequin Theater Company)
 2008 – Kaspar
 2008 – Europa
 2008 – El Pelícano (La Cualquiera Theater Company)
 2010 – TeLARAÑA (Harlequin Theater Company)
 2010 – Colo Colo 91 (Hermanos Ibarra Roa Theater Company)
 2011 – Fatamorgana de Amor con banda de música (University of Antofagasta Theater Company)
 2012 – Venecia (Harlequin Theater Company)
 2013 – 
 2013 – El Otro (Niño Proletario Theater Company)
 2014 – Barrio Miseria (Niño Proletario Theater Company)
 2015 – El homosexual o la dificultad de expresarse
 2012 – El Otro (Niño Proletario Theater Company)
 2016 – Fulgor (Niño Proletario Theater Company)

As director
 2005 – Electra e Ifigenia (hablan ante un cuerpo) (La Cualquiera Theater Company)
 2007 – La historia de la gaviota y el gato que le enseñó a volar (Harlequin Theater Company)
 2008 – El Pelícano (La Cualquiera Theater Company)
 2008 – Palomita Blanca (Harlequin Theater Company)
 2011 – Partido Boca Arriba
 2012 – Carabinero (Harlequin Theater Company)
 2012 – Ekeko (o el anhelo del mar)

As assistant director
 2014 – Barrio Miseria (Niño Proletario Theater Company)
 2015 – La pandilla del Arcoiris (Harlequin Theater Company)

Awards and recognitions

Film

Theater

References

External links
 

1980 births
20th-century Chilean actresses
20th-century Chilean educators
21st-century Chilean actresses
21st-century Chilean educators
Chilean film actresses
Chilean stage actresses
Chilean theatre directors
Chilean television actresses
Living people
People from Antofagasta
Women theatre directors